Sueño Fútbol was a Colombian football reality television programme shown on RCN Televisión.

References

Association football reality television series
Colombian reality television series
RCN Televisión original programming